Neoregelia kerryi is a species of flowering plant in the genus Neoregelia. This species is endemic to Brazil. Its name has also been incorrectly spelt Neoregelia kerryae.

Taxonomy
Neoregelia kerryi was first described by Elton Leme in 1998. The specific epithet kerryi was given as a tribute to Kerry Herndon, former president of a bromeliad nursery in Florida. As Kerry Herndon is a man, the epithet kerryi is correct; kerryae would be for a woman.

References

kerryi
Flora of Brazil